Tehkhand is one of the oldest villages in South East district of New Delhi. It is situated Near Okhla Industrial Area. Tehkhand Depot of Delhi Transport Corporation is also situated near to the Tehkhand Village. Tehkhand is Dominated by Bidhuri and Mavi Clan of Gurjar Community. About 900 years ago the Bidhuri clan of Gurjar Community shifted to Tehkhand from Jatwadi village of Mathura.

Notable people

 Sahi Ram, Two Times MLA from Tughlakabad Assembly.
 Nitin Mavi, Pro Kabaddi Player

 Abhishek Bidhuri, Youngest Councillor in Municipal Corporation of Delhi.

 Sunil Verma Bidhuri, Former Councillor

See also
 Tughlakabad Village
 Madanpur Khadar Village
 Khizrabad Village
 Fatehpur Beri Village
 Old Pilanji Village

References

Villages in South East District Delhi
Villages in New Delhi district